Vf or VF may stand for:

Arts and entertainment
Virtua Fighter, a series of fighting games by Sega
 Variable fighter, in the Macross manga series

Businesses and organizations
 VF Corporation, a clothing company
 Valuair, an airline based in Singapore, IATA code VF
 Vodafone, a UK-based mobile/cell phone network
 Vaterländische Front, a former Austrian political party
 Värmlands Folkblad, a Swedish-language daily newspaper
 VinFast, an automobile manufacturer from Vietnam

Science, technology, and mathematics

Biology and medicine
 Ventricular fibrillation, a cardiac arrhythmia
 Visual field
 Vocal fold

Other uses in science, technology, and mathematics
 Forward Voltage of a diode
 Vector field, in mathematics
 Final velocity (vf) in physics
 Voice Frequency (300–3000 Hz)
 a radio call sign format used in Canada to denote low-power broadcast transmitters, usually but not always exempt from conventional broadcast licensing

Other uses
 Squadron (aviation), in military aviation
 VF, Fighting Squadron, United States Navy acronym
 Vicar Forane, or Dean (Christianity)
 Video floppy, an analog floppy diskette format to store still images